Marco Zoppo (1433 – 19 February 1498) was an Italian painter of the Renaissance period, active mainly in Bologna.

He was born in Cento. He was a pupil of the painter Lippo Dalmasio then for a few years with Francesco Squarcione around 1455. He was a contemporary of Andrea Mantegna. He painted a number of variations of the Virgin and Child Enthroned with Saints while he was in Bologna. Francesco Francia was one of his pupils. He died in Venice to where he had left after working for Squarcione.

ARTISTIC CAREER
The oldest document in which Marco Ruggieri, known as lo Zoppo, appears, dates back to 1452, when the young painter, living in his native Cento, is entrusted with the gilding of a statue of the Virgin and Child. The following year lo Zoppo is documented in Padua, in the workshop of the ‘tailor and embroiderer’ Francesco Squarcione, whose adopted son he will soon become.

During these Paduan years, Zoppo is strongly influenced by the art of Donatello, who had recently finished the impressive bronze altarpiece of the Basilica del Santo, and of the contemporary work of Nicolò Pizolo and Andrea Mantegna, both employed in the family chapel of the Ovetari. As witness to his particular predilections, a few works survive, strongly influenced by the expressive physicality of the Tuscan sculptor and by the perspective solutions refined by the two Paduan painters in the Ovetari workshop. Among these are the Wimborne Madonna, named after a former owner, now preserved in the Louvre, and the Colville folio in the British Museum.

By September 1455 lo Zoppo is no longer in Padua, but in Venice where he appears in court against his adoptive father, Squarcione, with whom he breaks all personal and legal ties.

It is possible that Zoppo returns promptly to Bologna, perhaps already by 1456. The painter executes many important works there, among which a painted Crucifix, preserved today in the Museo dei Cappuccini, and the ‘Retablo’ for the high altar of the Church of San Clemente in the Collegio di Spagna, completed in collaboration with the engraver Agostino De Marchi from Crema.

One very ambiguous and disputed picture is the Head of the Baptist in Pesaro, linked to Marco Zoppo following Berenson’s attribution, but also given to Giovanni Bellini, as proposed instead by Roberto Longhi. Longhi's theory has been contested by Berenson in 1932, by Cesare Brandi in 1949 and by Robertson in 1960, but strongly defended by other important academics, such as Rodolfo Pallucchini and Alessandro Conti.

List of works
Madonna del Latte (1453-1455) Louvre, Paris
Resurrezione, Metropolitan Museum of Art, New York City
Madonna col Bambino, National Gallery of Art, Washington D.C.
San Pietro, National Gallery of Art, Washington D.C.
Madonna col Bambino, National Gallery of Art, Washington D.C.
Sant'Agostino, National Gallery, London
Cristo morto sostenuto da santi, National Gallery, London
Cristo morto sostenuto da angeli e da san Giacomo, British Museum, London
Madonna col Bambino e due putti, British Museum, London
Cristo deposto sorretto dagli angeli, San Giovanni Battista, Pesaro
San Girolamo nella selva, Thyssen-Bornemisza Museum, Madrid
Madonna in trono e santi, (1471) Gemäldegalerie, Berlin
Il Crocifisso di Cesena, Cesena, Private collection
"Saint Jerome in Penitence", Baltimore, Walters Art Museum<ref><ref>https://art.thewalters.org/detail/13974/saint-jerome-in-penitence/

External links

 Grove Art Encyclopedia excerpt

Painters from Bologna
Italian Renaissance painters
Quattrocento painters
1433 births
1498 deaths
Italian male painters
People from Cento
15th-century Italian painters